The European Society of Clinical Microbiology and Infectious Diseases (ESCMID) is a non-profit scientific international organization with headquarters in Basel, Switzerland. Its mission is to improve the diagnosis, treatment and prevention of infection-related diseases by promoting and supporting research, education, training, and good medical practice.
An   important activity of the society is the organization of the annual scientific congress ECCMID (European Congress of Clinical Microbiology and Infectious Diseases). This is recognized as the largest international forum for disseminating research in the fields of medical microbiology and infectious diseases for experts in academia, clinical settings and industry. The congress began as a biennial event, with about 1,500 participants at its inaugural occurrence in 1983. It became an annual event in the year 2000, and it has grown since then, now attracting around 14,000 participants annually. More than 5,000 scientific abstracts are submitted for inclusion each year by researchers from multiple countries. The most recent ECCMID was held online in April 2022 in a hybrid format, both online and onsite in Lisbon, Portugal.

History
The society was founded as ESCM (European Society of Clinical Microbiology) at the end of 1982 by the founding fathers Jacques Acar, Tom Bergan, Ilja Braveny, Arne Forsgren, Evelio J. Perea, Jan Verhoef, Arturo Visconti, David Williams, Eugène Yourassowsky and Ottokar Zak, with Verhoef elected as the first president of the society (from 1983 to 1990). In 1990, infectious diseases experts were included in the society, with the name transitioning from ESCM to ESCMID (European Society of Clinical Microbiology and Infectious Diseases), as well as a change in the name of the society’s congress from ECCM (European Congress of Clinical Microbiology) to ECCMID (European Congress of Clinical Microbiology and Infectious Diseases). At this time, subject-specific study groups were also created, and in 1995, the society’s journal Clinical Microbiology and Infection was launched. From the year 2000, ECCMID became an annual event. During the early 2000s, the activities of EUCAST (European Committee for Antimicrobial Susceptibility Testing) began and ESCMID was represented as scientific advisor for the newly established European Centre for Diseases Control (ECDC). From the years 2007-2012, the international observership program, and parity commission were established. In the late 2010s, EUCIC    (European Committee on Infection Control) was established, and the society’s membership exceeded 8,000 people. ESCMID currently counts professionals from 133 countries across the world among its members.

Structure
ESCMID is headquartered in Basel, Switzerland. The main governance organ is the Executive Committee (EC), which is elected by ESCMID members, and which is further divided into several subcommittees with specific functions (professional affairs, education, scientific affairs, ECCMID programme, publication, international affairs, ethics advisory, guidelines ).
The Assembly of Members takes place at the annual ECCMID, which serves as a forum for discussion and resolution of professional matters of common interest. The EC elects a president for a two-year term. The current President is Prof. Maurizio Sanguinetti of the Università Cattolica del Sacro Cuore in Rome, Italy. The President-elect and Secretary General is Prof. Annelies Zinkernagel of the Universitätsspital Zürich in Zürich, Switzerland.

Activities

Research and education
ESCMID drives scientific knowledge forward by bringing together professionals in the fields of clinical microbiology and infectious diseases and by supporting the generation and distribution of scientific information through conferences, research projects, medical guidelines, postgraduate courses, workshops, summer school, EUCAST and EUCIC certification. Scientific conferences cover a range of current topics from basic science to clinical practice. ESCMID provides funding and administrative support for research projects, as well as it is a partner in EU-funded research programs. Education is carried out through courses/workshops of two- to four-day duration focusing on specific clinical or laboratory issues, as well as an annual one-week summer school that covers a broad range of topics in clinical microbiology and infectious diseases.

Guidelines
ESCMID also promotes the development and dissemination of clinical and laboratory practice guidelines  according to the principles of evidence-based medicine, to harmonize European diagnostic, therapeutic and
infection control procedures. Main operational procedures for guidelines development are reported in the ESCMID manual for clinical practice guidelines and other guidance documents. Examples of recently published documents focused on drug treatment and clinical management of COVID 19, Lyme diseases, Sepsis, Clostridioides difficile infection.

ESCMID Study Groups
ESCMID study groups are special interest groups consisting of society members, involved in the study of specific areas of clinical microbiology and infectious diseases. The study groups are involved in proposing scientific symposia, educational workshops and meet-the-expert sessions for ECCMID, proposing educational courses/workshops, and publishing scientific articles in ESCMID’s name. During COVID-19 pandemic, several study groups began producing virtual content, such as web-symposia series or online conferences.

ECCMID (European congress of Clinical Microbiology and Infectious Diseases)
ECCMID is recognized as the largest international forum for presentations and discussions of research in the fields of clinical microbiology and infection for experts from academia, the clinical setting and the industry. The first European Congress of Clinical Microbiology (ECCM) was organized in 1983 in Bologna, Italy. After the Society’s inclusion of infectious diseases in the late 80s, the first ECCMID was held in 1991 in Oslo, Norway. Initially a biannual congress, in the year 2000, ECCMID became an annual event. Since its initiation with around 1,500 participants, ECCMID has grown, and now attracts around 14,000 participants every year. The number of submitted abstracts has risen to over 5,000, of which roughly 70% are accepted for oral or poster presentation. A large pharmaceutical exhibition sites alongside a broad-based program in clinical microbiology and infectious diseases.

Awards and Grants
ESCMID supports young clinicians and researchers as well as established scholars with awards and grants to acknowledge past achievements and provide an incentive for future accomplishments. ESCMID supports its members’ research projects and training with around seven hundred thousand euros every year.
List   of available awards and grants:
•	CAREer Grant
•	Award for Excellence in Clinical Microbiology and Infectious Diseases
•	Young Investigator Award for Research in Clinical Microbiology and Infectious Diseases
•	The TAE Outstanding Trainee Award
•	Research Grants
•	Study Group Research Grants
•	ECCMID Travel Grant
•	ECCMID Program Book Grants
•	The ISF/ESCMID Sepsis Award
•	Attendance Grants for Educational and Scientific Meetings
•	ISID/ESCMID joint fellowships

Clinical Microbiology and Infection
Clinical Microbiology and Infection (CMI) is the official peer-reviewed ESCMID publication, which publishes monthly issues and additional supplements devoted to special themes. The scope of the journal comprises basic and applied research relevant to therapy and diagnostics in the fields of microbiology, infectious diseases, virology, parasitology, immunology and epidemiology as related to these fields. The Editor-in-Chief is Dr. Leonard Leibovici from Tel Aviv University, Israel. The 2020 impact factor is 8.067 with around 4,000 manuscripts submitted to the journal.

Other Publications
The Manual of Clinical Microbiology is a hard-copy publication jointly produced by ESCMID and Société Française de Microbiologie (SFM), covering general clinical microbiology, diagnosis, specific microorganisms, epidemiology and infection control. The ESCMID Yearbook is published and presented each spring at ECCMID. This publication gives a comprehensive overview of the society’s activities over the previous year.  ESCMID also publish white papers on generic competencies in antimicrobial prescribing and stewardship, through a structured Europe-wide consensus procedure. The electronic weekly newsletter includes timely information of interest to clinical microbiology and infectious diseases professionals.

Professional Affairs
ESCMID supports the career development of members by creating a platform for them to connect with experienced professionals in their field. An important activity is the Observership program, which allows infectious diseases specialists and clinical microbiologists to visit renown centres outside their country. The Mentorship program is accessible to ESCMID full members and young scientist members, who can receive guidance for research and career development from a senior ESCMID member. The ESCMID Parity Commission was founded to review and improve representation of minorities as well as gender and geographical balance in the society’s fields of expertise. The Trainee Association of ESCMID (TAE) aims at widening career opportunities for young scientists at the beginning of their career. Among other professional affairs activities are the cooperation with other organizations in clinical microbiology and infectious diseases; Collaboration with relevant sections of the European Union of Medical Specialists (UEMS); Professional policy issues in the fields of CM and ID; Matters relating to professional training, mobility and recruitment; Equal opportunities; Trainees’ issues.

Cooperative Initiatives
ESCMID maintains cooperative partnerships with many professional societies and organizations. The Society also participates in scientific projects and networks, takes a leadership role in the consultation process with European health authorities, and cooperates with industry representatives in the areas of research and development, science communication, awards, grants and fellowships. Especially important are cooperative initiatives with societies, both in Europe and abroad, that share a similar mission with ESCMID.

ESCMID’s standing committees: EUCAST and EUCIC
ESCMID also promotes the development of international research and policy initiatives. Among them, EUCAST (European Committee on Antimicrobial Susceptibility Testing) is a professional standing committee tasked to set breakpoints for new antibacterial and antifungal agents, as well as revising existing ones, on behalf of the European Medicines Agency (EMA) [12]. In 2014, EUCIC (European Committee for Infection Control) was formed with the goal to harmonize infection control and preventive measures to reduce morbidity and mortality due to hospital-acquired infections.

ESCMID Emerging Infections Task Force
Emerging Infection Task Force (EITaF) was established in March 2017 with the aim of creating a platform to raise awareness on emerging infectious diseases. EITaF provides up to date information on outbreaks with epidemic or pandemic potential and establishes panel of experts to evaluate emerging infections threat and pathogens’ diagnostic challenges. Moreover, EITaF promotes research and education on emerging infections in collaboration with ESCMID Study Groups and Executive Committee.

COVID-19 Activities
In the early months of the COVID-19 pandemic, ESCMID organised a series of group teleconferences with representatives from infectious disease and clinical microbiology societies to discuss about diagnosis, treatment and public health measurements. In September 2020, these activities culminated in ESCMID first-ever fully virtual conference, the ESCMID Conference on Coronavirus Disease (ECCVID). ESCMID Study Groups also produced guidance documents on various topics related to COVID-19, as well as several COVID-19 related articles published in the CMI journal.

See also
Infectious Diseases Society of America
European Federation of Biotechnology
International Society for Infectious Diseases
The Journal of Infectious Diseases
European Journal of Clinical Microbiology & Infectious Diseases

References

External links
 ESCMID
 EUCAST

1983 establishments in Germany
Biology in Europe
International medical associations of Europe
International medical and health organizations
Medical associations based in Switzerland
Microbiology organizations
Organisations based in Basel
Organisations based in Munich
Scientific organizations established in 1983
Virology organizations
Learned societies of Switzerland